Separ is a  serving in the Northern Fleet of the Islamic Republic of Iran Navy.

Construction and commissioning 
She was commissioned into service on 5 December 2017.

Service history 
Separ, along with her sister Joshan, left home on 22 April 2019 for a training and flag mission. The two made a visit to Aktau, Kazakhstan, before returning on 29 April 2019.

See also

 List of current ships of the Islamic Republic of Iran Navy

References 

Missile boats of the Islamic Republic of Iran Navy
Ships built at Shahid Tamjidi shipyard